is a Japanese anime series by Sunrise from 1999. Seraphim Call may be considered avant-garde in several respects. For example: it is an anthology of individual stories while most other anime is serialized.  Other examples include a surprise ending that comes at the beginning of one of the stories, an episode seen entirely through the eyes of a plush toy, one is largely a Thunderbirds parody, and two nearly identical episodes from individual twin perspectives.  The experimentation in plot structure can be very subtle often requiring the viewer to watch each episode twice before noticing it.

Plot
Each story takes place in the year 2010, in a futuristic city named Neo-Acropolis on an artificial island in Japan. Among the city's residents are 11 girls, each facing a different dilemma.

Characters

Yukina is a high-school girl who possesses a high level of skill in science and engineering.  She also has androphobia, and travels around in a giant robot in order to avoid being around men.

Despite her age, Tanpopo still enjoys picture books, stuffed toys and colouring.  She always wears a bright (usually orange) hair ribbon.

Chinami lives with her divorced father and two young siblings, and spends most of her time doing housework.  She enjoys baking sweets, and has a wish to study pastry-making in Paris.

Hatsumi has been an athletic tomboy all her life and has no desire to be feminine; she believes that if she is not feminine, she cannot be beautiful, either.  However, after she is chosen to model for a painting, her outlook begins to change.

Out of the Murasame family's twin daughters, Shion is the one intended to inherit her father's company.  Her personality is methodical, sharp, and cold, but she has a very strong bond with Sakura.

Sakura, the younger of the Murasame twins, will apparently inherit her mother's company when she comes of age.  She is quiet and tries to watch over Shion.

Saeno has a deep love for mathematics of all types, but chose to become an English teacher, as she thinks of math as being something precious that she cannot teach to someone who does not love it.

Ayaka is the kind-hearted daughter of a fabulously wealthy man, but she spends his fortune too frivolously (often without making it clear how much the items cost beforehand) and dreams of protecting world peace.

Kasumi is practical and rarely speaks.  She is unimpressed that her actions at a park fountain have transformed into a ritual for good luck amongst young girls, and actually finds it irritating that people all over the city are attributing completely unrelated messages and ideas to her.  She works on a camera crew for a news station, and likes to ride her motorcycle.

Using the pen name Subaru Kurumigawa, shy high-schooler Kurumi has secretly become the author of a manga that is so popular it has been made into an anime.  She works hard on her manga, to the point of falling asleep on the drawing table, but keeps her identity secret from those who know her in real life.  Due to the masculine nature of Kurumi's pen name, most of her audience assumes that she is male (including Tanpopo, who later concludes that Kurumi is a homosexual man).

Urara is the daughter of the late architect who designed Neo-Acropolis.  She describes herself as "quiet and indecisive", and loves both nature and architecture (particularly that of the city her father built).  Since the death of her father, Urara has been the caretaker of her sick mother.

Episodes

Ending themes
Each episode has a different ending theme performed by the voice actress of the main character.  The closing theme to the final episode is "I miss you" written and performed by "ancy".

References
 Official Site (Accessed through the Wayback Machine)
 Sunrise data card

External links 
 The Seraphim Call Publication Catalogue

1999 anime television series debuts
Fiction set in 2010
Dengeki G's Magazine
Japanese LGBT-related television shows
LGBT in anime and manga
Sunrise (company)
TV Tokyo original programming
Yuri (genre) anime and manga